Portage is the practice of carrying a canoe or other boat over land to avoid an obstacle on the water route.

Portage may also refer to:

Places

United States
Portage, Alaska
Portage, Indiana
Portage, Maine
Portage, Michigan
Portage (town), New York 
Portage, Ohio
Portage, Pennsylvania
Portage, Utah
Portage, Wisconsin
Portage County (disambiguation) (multiple)
Portage Lake (disambiguation)
Portage Lakes (Ohio), a group of lakes
Portage Lakes, Ohio, a place there
Portage Glacier, Alaska
Portage River (Ohio) in northwest Ohio
Portage Township (disambiguation) (multiple locations)

Canada
Portage, Nova Scotia
Portage, Prince Edward Island
Portage la Prairie, Manitoba, Canada (often referred to as "Portage")
Portage—Lisgar, a federal electoral district covering the city of Portage la Prairie
Portage Avenue, a street in Winnipeg, Manitoba
201 Portage
Portage and Main
Portage Place
Portage la Prairie (disambiguation)

Other
Portage (education), an educational service for pre-school children developed in Portage, Wisconsin
Portage (software), the package management system for Gentoo Linux
A section of a cyclo-cross race course where a rider must dismount and carry their bicycle

See also
 Grand Portage (disambiguation)